Iska, ISKA or Iška may refer to 
ISKA (sports governing body), also known as the International Sport Karate Association or International Sport Kickboxing Association
Iska, Estonia, a village
Iška, a river in Slovenia
Iška, Ig, a settlement  in Slovenia
Iška Loka, a village in Slovenia
Iška Vas, a village  in Slovenia
Iska Geri (1920–2002), German film and television actress
Iska's Journey, a 2007 Hungarian film
Odyssey of Iska, a 1971 album by  American jazz saxophonist Wayne Shorter

See also
ISCA (disambiguation)